Henry Marten may refer to:

Henry Marten (politician) (c. 1562–1641), Tudor politician
Henry Marten (regicide) (1602–1680), his son
Sir Henry Martin, 2nd Baronet (1768–1842), cricketer
Henry Marten (educator) (1872–1948), Provost of Eton

See also
Henry Martin (disambiguation)